Moncreiffe Island, also known as Friarton Island, is an island in Perth, Scotland. It divides the River Tay into two channels as it flows through Perth, and is crossed by the single-track Tay Viaduct, carrying the Scottish Central Railway.

Land use 

The King James VI Golf Course is situated on and covers much of the island with the remaining land used for allotments.

At the 2011 census, it is the only permanently inhabited freshwater island in Scotland which is not on Loch Lomond.

Wildlife 
There are wild garlic, common bluebells, sweet cicely, broom and dog violets. The island is also frequently used by beavers.

References

External links 
Panorama
King James VI Golf Club

River islands of Scotland
Landforms of Perth, Scotland
Islands of the Tay
Islands of Perth and Kinross